The Dark Man (AKA Man Detained) is a 1951 British black and white, film-noir, thriller, crime, drama, film, from Rank Studios, written and directed by Jeffrey Dell, and starring Edward Underdown, Maxwell Reed and Natasha Parry.

Plot
At a farmhouse in a lonely wood, ruthless killer "The Dark Man" (Maxwell Reed) murders a petty criminal. He then shoots the taxi driver who drove him there, knowing he would be able to identify him. However, the murder is witnessed by a young actress, Molly (Natasha Parry), who is passing by. The Dark Man now has reason to silence her as well. When the police investigate the murder, Inspector Viner (Edward Underdown) is assigned to the case, and soon develops romantic feelings for Molly. Meanwhile, The Dark Man continues to stalk his prey, and is foiled in an attempt to strangle Molly at her home - but continues to pursue her. The climax comes with a desperate chase across a desolate landscape.

Cast
Edward Underdown - Detective Inspector Jack Viner
Maxwell Reed - The Dark Man
Natasha Parry - Molly Lester
William Hartnell - Superintendent Of Police
Barbara Murray - Carol Burns
Cyril Smith - Samuel Denny
Leonard White - Detective Evans
Johnny Singer - The Adjutant
Geoffrey Sumner - Major
Sam Kydd - Sergeant Major
Geoffrey Bond - Walsham Police Sergeant
Gerald Andersen - Walsham Police Inspector
Betty Cooper - Carol's Mother
Robert Long - Charles Burns
Grace Denbeigh-Russell - Hotel Proprietress
Norman Claridge - Doctor
John Hewer - Taxi Driver

Critical reception
The New York Times wrote: "this Julian Wintle production often stirs up a fair amount of suspense and absorption, chiefly because of the efficient direction of Jeffrey Dell, an excellent performance by Edward Underdown, as a detective, and a painless round-up of typical British "types" in minor roles. But the scenario is a meandering affair overbalanced with too many sneering close-ups of its culprits, and...anything but suggestive of the banner of the distributors, Fine Arts Films, Inc.". AllMovie noted: "the plot is nothing new, though the settings--a provincial repertory theatre, a military rifle range--are rather novel"; and Britmovie thought, "Edward Underdown is clearly too old to be the young policeman and love interest, but brooding Maxwell Reed is very effective as the shadowy ‘Dark Man’."

References

External links

1951 films
1950s crime thriller films
British crime thriller films
Film noir
Films directed by Jeffrey Dell
British black-and-white films
Films set in Kent
1950s English-language films
1950s British films